Blood Sucking Freaks (originally released as The Incredible Torture Show) is a 1976 American exploitation splatter film directed by Joel M. Reed and starring Seamus O'Brien, Luis De Jesus, Viju Krem, Niles McMaster, Dan Fauci, Alan Dellay, and Ernie Pysher. Set in New York City, the film follows a human trafficking ring masquerading as an experimental theater group, which stages Grand Guignol-style performances for audiences, who are unaware that actual murders and torture are being enacted onstage.

Filmed under the working title Sardu: Master of the Screaming Virgins, it was originally released as The Incredible Torture Show in November 1976. Film distributor Troma Entertainment retitled the film Blood Sucking Freaks upon their acquisition of it in 1981. Troma initially made cuts in hopes of getting an R-rating from the Motion Picture Association, but eventually released the version that had all of the most graphic scenes included and was labeled as an R-rated film despite having no such designation from the MPA. The ratings group subsequently sued Troma for copyright infringement in applying the R-rating without permission; Troma withdrew the rating label, and to date the MPA has refused to give Blood Sucking Freaks a review at all. 

Blood Sucking Freaks went on to develop a cult following, and has been noted as a dark-comic parody of the New York City theater world. Filmsite.org named it one of the most controversial films of all time.

Plot
In New York City's SoHo district, Master Sardu runs a Grand Guignol-style theater with his assistant, the little person Ralphus. The troupe put on grotesque, sadomasochistic shows featuring human-trafficked women whom Sardu and his performers brutalize onstage to audiences who are unaware that the spectacle they are witnessing is in fact real. Professional ballerina Natasha Di Natalie attends one of the performances with her boyfriend, Tom, during which a woman is tortured with an iron tourniquet that crushes her skull, and another dismembered before Ralphus removes and eats her eyeball. Theater critic Creasy Silo is also in attendance, and has an unfavorable response to the show, which he deems pretentious and exploitative. After the show, Ralphus feeds scraps of human flesh to a group of caged women kept in the theater basement as slaves.

Sardu retaliates against Silo by ordering his disciples to kidnap him. The group chain Silo in the theater basement, and force him to view their methods of mind control via physical torture of their victims, turning the women into submissive sex slaves, while Sardu espouses his philosophy behind his shows. The troupe kidnap Natasha next, hoping to utilize her to lend artistic legitimacy to their shows and catapult them to Broadway and eventually Hollywood. Tom discovers that Natasha is missing, and teams with corrupt police officer John Tucci to find her.

Meanwhile, the troupe force Natasha to spectate an array of torturous acts against their slaves, including tooth removals, lobotomies, and dismemberment, rendering Natasha into a fearful psychological state of submission. Tucci and Tom infiltrate the theater and attend one of Sardu's performances, where Natasha is set to perform. Natasha performs an elegant ballet routine for the audience that devolves into a striptease, culminating in her torturing and killing of Silo onstage.

Tucci reveals to Tom that he has uncovered a trove of valuable silver and precious metals in the theater basement, and intends to steal them. After the show ends and the crowd disperses, Tucci and Tom witness a woman crawling from behind the stage with her legs dismembered. Tucci arrests Sardu's female assistant while Tom attempts to free Natasha. Tucci finds Sardu erotically kissing Silo's corpse in the basement, and holds him at gunpoint before tying him to a post and pistol-whipping him. Sardu responds by asking Tucci to "hit him harder".

In the basement, Tucci frees Sardu's caged women who proceed to cannibalize him. As Tom attempts to flee with Natasha, Sardu relishes the sounds of his slaves killing Tucci. In a tunnel under the theater, Natasha, still brainwashed, bludgeons Tom to death with a sledgehammer before joining the other slaves, who have proceeded to brutally kill and dismember Sardu and Ralphus.

Cast

Themes
Blood Sucking Freaks would go on to achieve minor cult following due to its ability to slip between being a serious horror film with sexual overtones and a campy send-up of gore films. The violent deaths of lead actors Seamus O'Brien (stabbed to death in his apartment by a burglar) and Viju Krem (shot by her husband on a hunting trip) after the film's release also contributed to the film's notoriety. Filmmaker Eli Roth, who was inspired by the film, commented in a 2014 interview that it functions as a dark parody of the New York City theater world.

Depictions of violence
Some of the torture methods depicted fictionally in the film include the use of thumb screws, a skull crushed by a vise, amputation at the wrist by a bone saw, the amputation of fingers by a meat cleaver, electro-shock, suspension, the extraction of teeth, the portrayal of an electric drill through a skull with the brains sucked through a straw, the amputation of feet by a chainsaw, stretching on St. Andrew's Cross, caning and subsequent decapitation by guillotine, as well as brainwashing, whipping, darts, and quartering.

Release
The film premiered under the title The Incredible Torture Show in November 1976, and was later acquired by Troma Entertainment, who re-released it under the title Blood Sucking Freaks in 1981. The film was screened out of competition at the 1981 Cannes Film Festival.

Censorship
Troma executive Lloyd Kaufman submitted the film to the Motion Picture Association (MPA) for American release in 1981, but the organization refused to grant the film an R-rating in its full-length cut. According to Kaufman, the association approved only 54 minutes of the film. Troma proceeded to release the film in its full cut with the R-rating label, which led the MPA to sue Troma for copyright infringement on the grounds of utilizing the unapproved ratings label. The suit was ultimately settled after Troma was mandated to issue a public apology which was published by The Hollywood Reporter.

Critical response
Blood Sucking Freaks received largely negative reviews from critics, and as of 2023, holds a 29% approval rating on the review aggregator Rotten Tomatoes, based on 7 reviews.

TV Guide panned the film, awarding it 0/4 stars calling the plot "flimsy"  and "[an] exercise in total gross-out".
Rob Wrigley from Classic Horror.com stated in his review on the film, "If anything makes it tolerable, it is that it is presented as comedy rather than tragedy. Unfortunately, it falls flat far more than it amuses. One could complain about the misogyny of it all. Or its willingness to offend everyone possible. Or even the vibrant, sardonic performances of the principals. But that is giving the film more credit than it deserves". Wrigley also criticized the film's acting.

Scott Weinberg from eFilmCritic.com panned the film stating in his review, "When people use the term 'bottom of the barrel', they often forget about the UNDERSIDE of the barrel, which is where poorly-made dreck like this belongs. It offers absolutely NOTHING in the way of entertainment, and I think you're a cruel little nutcase if you talk someone else into seeing it," also calling it "The nastiest, filthiest and just about WORST thing you will EVER SEE".

The Encyclopedia of Horror says "the film is deliberately tacky and tongue-in-cheek (but distasteful enough nonetheless), in the spirit of Herschell Gordon Lewis." The book reports the film was the subject of a campaign by Women Against Pornography.

It is considered to be one of the most controversial films of all time by Filmsite.org.
, the film has a 29% approval rating on the review aggregator Rotten Tomatoes based on 7 reviews, with an average score of 3.88/10.

Home media
Troma Entertainment released the film on DVD in 1998, and in a special edition Blu-ray on August 21, 2014.

In popular culture 
In the intro to De La Soul's debut album, 3 Feet High and Rising, Plug One cites Blood Sucking Freaks as his "favorite drama movie". Pro wrestler Chris Jericho borrowed the assistant's name for his own use, naming his bodyguard Ralphus in WCW.

Legacy
Joe Bob Briggs opened his second season of The Last Drive-In on Shudder with Chopping Mall and Blood Sucking Freaks.

Notes

References

Sources

External links 

 Blood Sucking Freaks at the Troma Entertainment movie database

1976 films
1976 horror films
Troma Entertainment films
American comedy horror films
American splatter films
American exploitation films
Films about ballet
Films about cannibalism
Films about dwarfs
Films about human trafficking in the United States
Films about mind control
Films about theatre
Films directed by Joel M. Reed
Films set in New York City
LGBT-related horror films
Necrophilia in film
Obscenity controversies in film
1970s comedy horror films
1970s English-language films
1970s exploitation films
1970s American films